I granatieri (The Grenadiers) is an 'Neapolitan operetta' in three acts by the Italian composer Vincenzo Valente with a libretto in Italian by Raffaele Della Campa and Joseph Méry. It has been called the first true Italian operetta.

Performance history
I granatieri had its world premiere in Turin on 26 October 1889, presented by Luigi Maresca's theatre company. Later performances include:
19 May 1897 – first performance in the Teatro Amazonas in Manaus, Brazil (reprised in 1899, 1900, 1902, and 1906) 
4 February 1898 – first performance in the Teatro Costanzi in Rome 
12 June 1911 – New York City premiere at the Irving Place Theatre

Roles
Nini soprano 
Dorotea soprano
Beatrice soprano 
Odoardo tenor 
Bernardo baritone 
Marchese Emilio baritone 
Giorgio bass 
John bass

Notes and references

Istituzione Casa della Musica di Parma, Intorno all'operetta
New York Times, "Old Timers' Festival Week" 13 June 1911, p. 9 (PDF)

Italian-language operas
Operettas
1889 operas
Operas